Gypsacanthus is a genus of flowering plants belonging to the family Acanthaceae.

Its native range is Mexico.

Species:
 Gypsacanthus nelsonii E.J.Lott, V.Jaram. & Rzed.

References

Acanthaceae
Acanthaceae genera